Sverdlovsk may refer to:
 Sverdlovsk, Russia, the city of Yekaterinburg as named from 1924 to 1991
 Sverdlovsk, Luhansk Oblast, a city in Ukraine
 Sverdlovsk Raion, raion in Ukraine
 Sverdlovsk Oblast, a federal subject of Russia

See also 
 Sverdlovsk anthrax leak
 Sverdlovsk Blue-gray Mottle-headed pigeon
 Sverdlov (disambiguation)
 Sverdlovsky (disambiguation)